Louis Philogène Brulart, Comte de Sillery and Marquis de Puysieux (or Puysieulx) (1702-1770) was a French diplomat and nobleman who served as Foreign Minister from 1747 to 1751 but was forced to retire due to ill-health.

Life

Louis Philogène Brulart was born 12 May 1702, only son of Carloman Philogène Brulart, Comte de Sillery (ca. 1663–1727) and his wife Mary-Louise Bigot (1662-1746); he also had a sister, Marie (1707-1771). His father commanded the Regiment de Conti but his career ended after he was badly wounded at Landen in 1693.

He married Charlotte Félicité Le Tellier (1708–1783), on 19 July 1722 and they had a daughter, Adelaide Felicite (1725-1785). He was also godfather to Charles-Alexis Brûlart (1737-1793), Comte de Genlis and acted as his guardian following the death of his parents. In 1762, Charles-Alexis married the author Stéphanie Félicité (1746-1830); elected to the National Convention in 1792 as a member of the Girondins faction, he was executed with many of his colleagues in 1793.

Career
De Puysieux came from a family with a long and distinguished record of service to the French Crown, going back to the 14th century; his relatives included Pierre Brûlart (1583-1640), joint Secretary of State for Foreign Affairs and War from 1617 to 1626, while his uncle Roger Brûlart (1640-1719) was Ambassador to Switzerland. 

Like his uncle, he became a diplomat and as was then common, also held a military commission. He was promoted Brigadier general in 1734 but France was mostly at peace from 1714 to 1733 and he saw little if any active service. In 1735, he was appointed French Ambassador to the Kingdom of Naples in 1735; lost in 1713 after the Treaty of Utrecht, Bourbon Spain regained it after the 1733 to 1735 War of the Polish Succession.

Although the War of the Austrian Succession began in 1740, Britain and France only formally became adversaries in 1744. Despite a series of victories in Flanders won by Marshall de Saxe, by 1746 France was close to bankruptcy. De Puysieux was appointed French plenipotentiary to the Congress of Breda, a bilateral negotiation with Britain to end the war. The French terms had been drawn up by Gabriel de Mably, who shortly afterwards fell from favour. This meant negotiations proceeded slowly, especially since the British envoy Lord Sandwich was instructed to delay, in the hope their position in Flanders would improve.

In the January 1747 , Britain agreed to fund Austrian and Sardinian forces in Italy and an Allied army of 140,000 in Flanders, increasing to 192,000 in 1748. The British were well aware of France's desperate financial state and although their economy was also impacted, they were far better equipped to finance it. The British Prime Minister Newcastle hoped the death of Philip V in July 1746 would tempt Spain to end their alliance with France, an assumption that proved incorrect.

De Puisieux was withdrawn, allegedly for failing to reach agreement but it was only after their defeat at Lauffeld in July 1747 that Britain proved willing to negotiate seriously. In the end, this was beneficial to his career, since no one was happy with the eventual 1748 Treaty of Aix-la-Chapelle. France seemed to have gained very little in return for its expenditure of money and men; the saying "as stupid as the peace" became a popular phrase in France, expressing contempt for the terms agreed at Breda and Aix-la Chapelle.

References

Sources

External links
 
 
 

1702 births
1770 deaths
Puisieulx, Louis Philogene Brulart, Marquis De
18th-century French diplomats
French people of the War of the Austrian Succession